The 13th Actors and Actresses Union Awards ceremony was held on 11 May 2004 at Madrid's Hotel Auditorium.

In addition to the competitive awards,  obtained the '' life achievement career award, whilst the Special Award went to the magazines Primer Acto and ADE Teatro.

Winners and nominees 
The winners and nominees are listed as follows:

Film

Television

Theatre

Newcomers

References 

Actors and Actresses Union Awards
2004 in Madrid
2004 television awards
2004 film awards
2004 theatre awards
May 2004 events in Europe